Geoffrey Digby may refer to:

Geoffrey John Digby, Australian lawyer and judge
Geoffrey Digby, character in The Baby and the Battleship